Aliabad (also Romanized as ‘Alīābād; also known as ‘Alīābād-e Tabārak) is a village in Qarah Kahriz Rural District, Qarah Kahriz District, Shazand County, Markazi Province, Iran. At the 2006 census, its population was 296, in 77 families.

References 

Populated places in Shazand County